Kim Jin-kyu (born 16 February 1985) is a retired South Korean football player. He has gained reputation as a defender who is also capable of scoring.

Club career
He began playing football during 4th grade at elementary school influenced by his older brother. After graduating from Andong High School, he headed straight to K League instead of playing for a university. During his days at Jeonnam Dragons, he set a record by becoming the youngest player to score a goal in his team. He later transferred to Júbilo Iwata in 2005.

Kim returned to Jeonnam Dragons in January 2007 amid rumours he will return to South Korea by playing for Suwon Samsung Bluewings. Kim wanted to keep his promise with coach Huh Jung-moo, who wanted him to play for Jeonnam because the coach helped him "during a difficult time".

On 25 July 2007, he joined FC Seoul. He was in FC Seoul which won the K League in 2010.

Kim transferred to Chinese Super League side Dalian Shide in January 2011. However, after Dalian's Korean manager Park Sung-hwa was sacked in May 2011, he lost his position in the club. Kim was loaned to J1 League club Ventforet Kofu for six months in July after managing eight appearances for the Chinese club. He returned to FC Seoul after Kofu were relegated to the Second Division.

In 2016 Kim signed for Pattaya United on loan from Muangthong United in the Thai Premier League.

International career 
He gained praise and notoriety during 2005 East Asian Football Championship. The Chinese coach at that time had pledged to end Koreaphobia by winning the match against Korea. The Chinese scored the first goal in the first half, but Kim prevented loss against China by scoring an equaliser. In 2006, he was selected to represent South Korea in FIFA World Cup. This time, however, his performance was below expectations when he played for Korea against Switzerland.

Kim was made captain in the Korean national football team for the 2008 Summer Olympics. Following the appointment as captain, Kim stated he would no longer free kick during the tournament.
 
He was included in the South Korea national football teams for the 2003 FIFA World Youth Championship, 2005 FIFA World Youth Championship, 2008 Summer Olympics, 2004 Asian Cup, 2005 East Asian Football Championship, 2006 World Cup, and 2004 Asian Cup.

Career statistics

Club

International

International goals
Results list South Korea's goal tally first.

Honours

Club
Jeonnam Dragons
FA Cup Runner-up: 2003

FC Seoul
K League 1 Winner (2): 2010, 2012
K League 1 Runner-up: 2008
FA Cup Winner (1): 2015
FA Cup Runner-up (1): 2014
League Cup Winner: 2010
League Cup Runner-up: 2007

Criticism
He has been criticized for his hot temper and unprofessional behavior. During the 2004 Asian Cup, he received a red card for his hand gesture against an Iranian player during South Korea's match against Iran national football team, and was suspended for two games.

He was also met with criticism for his performance after South Korea failed to advance to the round of 16 for the 2006 World Cup for his lack of aggressiveness when it has been revealed that he had never used tackles during the matches despite his position as a defender.

References

External links
 
 Kim Jin-kyu – National team stats at KFA 
 
 

Kim Jin-kyu Fancafe at Daum 

1985 births
Living people
Association football central defenders
South Korean footballers
South Korean expatriate footballers
South Korea under-20 international footballers
South Korea under-23 international footballers
South Korea international footballers
Jeonnam Dragons players
Júbilo Iwata players
FC Seoul players
Daejeon Hana Citizen FC players
Dalian Shide F.C. players
Ventforet Kofu players
Kim Jin-kyu
Fagiano Okayama players
K League 1 players
K League 2 players
Chinese Super League players
J1 League players
J2 League players
Kim Jin-kyu
Expatriate footballers in Japan
Expatriate footballers in China
Expatriate footballers in Thailand
2004 AFC Asian Cup players
2006 FIFA World Cup players
2007 AFC Asian Cup players
Footballers at the 2008 Summer Olympics
Olympic footballers of South Korea
South Korean expatriate sportspeople in Japan
South Korean expatriate sportspeople in China
South Korean expatriate sportspeople in Thailand
Footballers at the 2006 Asian Games
Sportspeople from North Gyeongsang Province
FC Seoul non-playing staff
Asian Games competitors for South Korea